Brady Allen Toops (born July 31, 1981) is an American musician, songwriter and a former baseball player. His debut album, Brady Toops, was released in 2013. His second album, Tried & True, was released in 2017. He appeared on the eleventh season of ABC’s The Bachelorette.

Early life
Toops was born in Minneapolis, Minnesota, on 31 July 1981, to educators George Toops Jr. and Kim Toops. He grew up in New London. He attended the New London-Spicer High School, and graduated in 2000. In 2000, Toops was among the twenty-five senior High School students who were awarded the Scholar Athlete Milk Mustache of the Year (SAMMY)  award. He received a $7,500 college scholarship and was featured in USA Today.

He studied Marketing at the University of Arkansas and graduated in 2004.

Career

Baseball 
Toops was recruited by Harvard, Minnesota, and Arkansas. He chose to play for the University of Arkansas. He played four years as a catcher with the Razorbacks, and had been named a captain of the team in 2003, until he was selected in the Major League Baseball draft of 2004 in the 10th round by the St. Louis Cardinals. His stint in the minor leagues would only last three years, when he stopped playing after the 2006 season.

Music 
Toops' music career began in 2007. His first release was with the single, Can't Stop Lovin''', which was released independently, in 2010. His next single, "A Little Love", came out in 2011, while the single, "Lord Have Mercy", was released the following year. The first extended play, A Little Love, was released by Underspoken Records, in 2012. His first studio album, Brady Toops, was released by Underspoken Records, on August 27, 2013.
 Podcast 
He hosts The Unravel with Brady Toops podcast. He also curates Soul Games a 12-week personal development program.
Personal life
In 2015, he competed in Season 11 of The Bachelorette, with Britt Nilsson and Kaitlyn Bristowe
Toops lives in Nashville, Tennessee.

Discography
Studio albums
 Tried & True (2017) Brady Toops (August 27, 2013, Underspoken)
EPs
 A Little Love (2012, Underspoken)
SinglesCan't Stop Lovin' (2010, Independent)''

References

External links
 Official website

1981 births
Living people
American performers of Christian music
Musicians from Minneapolis
Musicians from Arkansas
Musicians from Nashville, Tennessee
Songwriters from Minnesota
Songwriters from Arkansas
Songwriters from Tennessee